Piz Trevisina is a mountain of the Livigno Alps, located on the border between Italy and Switzerland. It lies on the range between the Val Poschiavo (Graubünden) and the Val Grosina (Lombardy).

References

External links
 Piz Trevisina on Hikr

Mountains of the Alps
Mountains of Graubünden
Mountains of Lombardy
Italy–Switzerland border
International mountains of Europe
Mountains of Switzerland
Val Poschiavo